L-759,633 is an analgesic drug that is a cannabinoid agonist. It is a fairly selective agonist for the CB2 receptor, with selectivity of 163x for CB2 over CB1.

It produces some similar effects to other cannabinoid agonists such as analgesia, but with little or no sedative or psychoactive effects due to its weak CB1 activity, and a relatively strong antiinflammatory effect due to its strong activity at CB2.

See also 
 L-759,656
 L-768,242

References 

Cannabinoids
Benzochromenes
Phenol ethers
CB1 receptor agonists
CB2 receptor agonists